Stuart Manley (born 15 January 1979) is a Welsh professional golfer.

Early life
Manley was born in Mountain Ash in the historic county of Glamorgan. He showed sporting promise at an early age, and at age 16 had trials with the football clubs Manchester United, Crystal Palace and Luton Town. However, he chose to concentrate on golf, taking a four-year scholarship to the University of West Florida. The highlight of his amateur career was playing in the 2003 Walker Cup.

Professional career
Manley turned professional in later 2003, and immediately joined the Challenge Tour, finishing 90th in his first season. At the end of that year he came through the qualifying school to earn a place on the European Tour for the first time. However, Manley has consistently failed to establish himself at the highest level; he is yet to retain his card by finishing in the top 115 at season's end, and has only regained it via the Challenge Tour in 2007 and qualifying school in 2008, 2010 and 2013.

Manley graduated from the PGA EuroPro Tour in 2012, returning to the Challenge Tour in 2013 where he won the Finnish Challenge. He narrowly missed out on winning a European Tour card, finishing 19th on the Challenge Tour rankings. However, he came 10th in European Tour Qualifying School to earn a 2014 European Tour category.

Manley hit the headlines in 2013 when, during the third round of the World Cup of Golf in Melbourne, he hit a hole-in-one followed by an 11 at the next hole. Manley had originally believed the hole-in-one had won him a Mercedes-Benz car, only to find out afterwards that the prize only applied to the final round of the tournament. He attributed the following score of 11 to his shock and disappointment at not winning the car, but still eventually ended with an even-par round of 72.

In February 2017 Manley finished runner-up in the Joburg Open, one of the Open Qualifying Series events. This finish gave him an entry to the 2017 Open Championship, his first major championship. The runner-up finish matched his previous best in a European Tour event, the 2013 Hong Kong Open, where he lost in a playoff. Despite his early season success, Manley had a poor season and failed to retain his card, returning to the Challenge Tour for 2018.

Manley showed some good form in 2018. In May he was third in the Andalucía Costa del Sol Match Play 9 after losing 3&2 to Grant Forrest in the semi-final. In June he was involved in two playoffs in two weeks, losing in the KPMG Trophy to Pedro Figueiredo after Figueiredo made a birdie at the first extra hole and then winning the Hauts de France Golf Open at the third extra hole when Grant Forrest made a bogey. He was also runner-up in the Northern Ireland Open and finished the season 9th in the Order of Merit to earn a place on the 2019 European Tour.

Professional wins (6)

Challenge Tour wins (3)

Challenge Tour playoff record (1–1)

PGA EuroPro Tour wins (1)

Jamega Pro Golf Tour wins (1)

Other wins (1)

Playoff record
European Tour playoff record (0–1)

Results in major championships

CUT = missed the halfway cut
Note: Manley only played in The Open Championship.

Team appearances
Amateur
European Youths' Team Championship (representing Wales): 2000
Palmer Cup (representing Great Britain & Ireland): 2002
European Amateur Team Championship (representing Wales): 2003
Walker Cup (representing Great Britain & Ireland): 2003 (winners)

Professional
World Cup (representing Wales): 2013, 2016, 2018

See also
2007 Challenge Tour graduates
2008 European Tour Qualifying School graduates
2010 European Tour Qualifying School graduates
2013 European Tour Qualifying School graduates
2015 European Tour Qualifying School graduates
2016 European Tour Qualifying School graduates
2018 Challenge Tour graduates

References

External links

Welsh male golfers
European Tour golfers
West Florida Argonauts men's golfers
People from Mountain Ash, Wales
Sportspeople from Rhondda Cynon Taf
Sportspeople from Aberdare
1979 births
Living people